Tridrepana adelpha is a moth in the family Drepanidae. It was described by Swinhoe in 1905. It is found in north-eastern India.

The wingspan is about 29.8-25.6 mm.

References

Moths described in 1896
Drepaninae